The following is a list of recurring Saturday Night Live characters and sketches introduced between November 15, 1980, and April 11, 1981, the sixth season of SNL.

Vickie & Debbie
A Gail Matthius and Denny Dillon sketch. Debuted November 15, 1980.

What's It All About
A Gilbert Gottfried and Denny Dillon sketch. Debuted November 15, 1980.

Paulie Herman
A Joe Piscopo sketch. Debuted December 6, 1980. Paulie Herman was a stereotypical "Jersey Guy" who liked to make fun of Piscataway Township, New Jersey residents. He was a rather annoying character who would constantly say, "I'm from Jersey!" and, when other characters mentioned the state, "You from Jersey? What exit?"

The character triggered an immediate outcry from residents of the area, and New Jersey as a whole.  The mayor of Piscataway was extremely offended because he thought that  the sketch depicted his hometown as a "chemical disaster area."  He demanded an apology, and even threatened to complain to the FCC.  The mayor stated that Piscataway was "the Sunbelt of New Jersey."  The sketch was soon dropped, but the character appeared one more time in a sketch about "Overexposed Characters" with Eddie Murphy's Velvet Jones, who stated he would also become overexposed.
Appearances

Raheem Abdul Muhammed
An Eddie Murphy sketch. Debuted December 6, 1980.

Appearances

Mary Louise
A Denny Dillon sketch. Debuted December 6, 1980.

Nadine and Rowena
A Denny Dillon and Gail Matthius sketch. Debuted December 13, 1980.

The Livelys
A Charles Rocket and Gail Matthius sketch. Debuted January 17, 1981.

Mister Robinson's Neighborhood
Mister Robinson's Neighborhood was a parody of the children's show Mister Rogers' Neighborhood, a PBS staple where new information about the world was presented by Fred Rogers in a quiet, methodical, loving and highly elocuted manner. In the sketch, Eddie Murphy's character, named "Mister Robinson", speaks and presents the show in a similarly patient manner, but lives in a considerably grittier venue and engages in a number of illegal and unethical activities for money due to his lack of a job, which he educates his young viewers about in each episode while at the same time teaching them cynical views on the government and life in general. For example, in one episode he tells his viewers that their hopes and dreams are pointless because it's impossible to find a job in the current economy and another episode contains a spoof of the Neighborhood of Make-Believe segment in which a puppet Ronald Reagan (whom Robinson consistently blames for his lack of a job and dire financial situation) tells the ghetto family hand puppets (represented as a brown glove with different small wigs on the fingers) that he cannot do anything to help them out of poverty in a very dismissing manner. Subsequently, he has Mr. Landlord (portrayed by Tim Kazurinsky) hunting him down for rent and sleeping with his wife, Mrs. Landlord (portrayed by Robin Duke) while giving him eviction notices and the police officers (one performed offscreen by Gary Kroeger) are after him for a number of petty crimes. A majority of episodes end with Robinson fleeing his apartment through the fire escape while singing a variant of Rogers' famous song "Tomorrow".

Incidentally, the first installment of "Mr. Robinson's Neighborhood", where Mr. Robinson gets a chemistry set from a delivery man named "Mr. Speedy" (played by Gilbert Gottfried in a parody of Mr. McFeely & his business name "Speedy Delivery"), was overshadowed by the "Who Shot Charles Rocket" recurring gag that ran through the episode and the controversy over Rocket saying, "I'd like to know who the fuck did it" during the goodnights. The book, "Saturday Night Live: The First 20 Years" has a still shot from the episode of Eddie Murphy as Mr. Robinson pointing to a sign that reads, "Bitch".

In the May 12, 1984 finale of Season 9, two episodes after Murphy left the cast, New York City Mayor Ed Koch performed a parody of the sketch on the original set entitled "Mayor Koch's Neighborhood."

During interviews with Stephen Colbert and Jimmy Kimmel in October 2019, Murphy expressed interest in reprising the sketch for when he returned to host the show in December. On December 21, 2019, Murphy reprised the role, in a newly updated version of the sketch in which Mister Robinson's Neighborhood has become gentrified.

Fred Rogers took no offense to Murphy's parody version of his show and found it amusing and affectionate, though he was grateful that Saturday Night Live was broadcast at a time when the children in his audience were unlikely to see it.

Appearances

I Married A Monkey
The I Married A Monkey sketches were created by Tim Kazurinsky to remind the viewing public that the show was indeed live. He essentially played himself, working with the premise that he had married a chimpanzee named Madge in a bizarre soap opera world. There was a real chimp on stage, and some sketches featured their "children" played by baby chimps.

Kazurinsky felt that the show had become too polished, and felt that the idea would offer some unpredictability. He explained in Live From New York, "I did it because I knew something would screw up and people would see that it was live. People would ask me 'When do you tape the show?' No, it's called Saturday Night Live. It's live."  He eventually decided to put a stop to the sketches when he realized the dangers chimpanzees posed when they got agitated.

Episodes Featuring I Married A Monkey

Frank & Papa
A Tim Kazurinsky and Tony Rosato sketch. Debuted April 11, 1981.

References

Lists of recurring Saturday Night Live characters and sketches
Saturday Night Live
Saturday Night Live
Saturday Night Live in the 1980s